There are over forty 19th-century buildings at Black Creek Pioneer Village, all of which are decorated and furnished according to the styles of the 1860s, some with the building's original furnishings.

Several of the buildings were originally constructed at their current location. The others were relocated from other communities in Ontario.

Notes

References

External links
Buildings at Black Creek Pioneer Village

Buildings and structures in Toronto
Black Creek Pioneer Village